Amir Mohebi, (born 24 February 1981) is an Iranian footballer who currently plays for Pas Hamedan in Iran's Premier Football League.

Club career

Club career statistics

 Assist Goals

International career
In 2009, Mohebi was summoned by the Iranian Football Federation to participate in a friendly match against Iceland.

References

Iranian footballers
Iran international footballers
F.C. Aboomoslem players
Tractor S.C. players
Living people
1981 births
Pas players
Association football midfielders